Tristan Koskor (born 28 November 1995) is an Estonian professional footballer who plays as a forward for Peyia.

Career
In March 2019, he briefly joined Pepsi Max League club Fylkir in Iceland.

International career
Koskor made his senior international debut for Estonia on 11 January 2019, replacing Henri Anier in the 74th minute of a 2–1 friendly win over Finland.

References

External links

1995 births
Living people
Sportspeople from Tartu
Estonian footballers
Association football forwards
Esiliiga players
Meistriliiga players
Tartu JK Tammeka players
Paide Linnameeskond players
Tristan Koskor
Estonia youth international footballers
Estonia under-21 international footballers
Estonia international footballers
Estonian expatriate footballers
Estonian expatriate sportspeople in Iceland
Estonian expatriate sportspeople in Cyprus
Expatriate footballers in Iceland
Expatriate footballers in Cyprus